Goran Ikonić (born March 23, 1980) is a Bosnian professional basketball player who currently plays for Vevey Riviera of the Swiss Basketball League.

External links
Abaliga.com Profile
Eurobasket.com Profile

1980 births
Living people
ABA League players
BBC Monthey players
BC Donetsk players
BC Politekhnika-Halychyna players
Bosnia and Herzegovina men's basketball players
Karşıyaka basketball players
KK Krka players
KK Leotar players
KK Rabotnički players
People from Zvornik
Shooting guards
Serbs of Bosnia and Herzegovina